The World Urban Forum (WUF) is the world’s premier conference on urban issues. It was established in 2001 by the United Nations to examine one of the most pressing issues facing the world today: rapid urbanisation and its impact on communities, cities, economies, climate change and policies.

The World Urban Forum is organised and run by the United Nations Human Settlements Programme.

The first World Urban Forum was held in Nairobi, Kenya in 2002 and has been held around the world ever since.

The forum has the following as its objectives:

 Raise awareness of sustainable urbanisation among stakeholders and constituencies, including the general public;
 Improve the collective knowledge of sustainable urban development through inclusive open debates, sharing of lessons learned and the exchange of best practices and good policies; and
 Increase coordination and cooperation between different stakeholders and constituencies for the advancement and implementation of sustainable urbanisation.

History 

 World Urban Forum I (WUF 1), Nairobi, Kenya, 2002
 World Urban Forum II (WUF 2), Barcelona, Spain, 13–17 September 2004
 World Urban Forum III (WUF 3), Vancouver, Canada, 19–23 June 2006
 World Urban Forum IV (WUF 4), Nanjing, China, 2008
 World Urban Forum V (WUF 5), Rio de Janeiro, Brazil, 22–26 March 2010
 World Urban Forum VI (WUF 6), Naples, Italy, 1–7 September 2012
 World Urban Forum VII (WUF 7), Medellin, Colombia, April 2014
 World Urban Forum IX (WUF 9), Kuala Lumpur, Malaysia, February 2018
 World Urban Forum X  (WUF 10), Abu Dhabi, United Arab Emirates, 2020
 World Urban Forum XI  (WUF 11), Katowice, Poland, 2022
 World Urban Forum XII (WUF 12), Cairo, Egypt, 2024

References

External links 
 World Urban Forum – official website

United Nations conferences
Urban planning